Infor Nexus (formerly known as GT Nexus) is an independent business unit of Infor LLC offering a multienterprise supply chain network. The on-demand global supply chain management platform and integrated applications are used worldwide by businesses to manage global direct procurement, supplier networks, global logistics and global trade processes. Founded in 1998 in Oakland, California, it merged with TradeCard in 2013, and in September 2015, GT Nexus was acquired by Infor. Today, Infor Nexus is a business unit of Infor.

Infor Nexus operates in the Americas, Europe, and Asia with a focus on retail/apparel and industrial manufacturing. Customers include companies in pharmaceuticals, high tech, automotive, CPG, apparel and footwear. Logistics service providers, financial service providers, and suppliers are also part of the Infor Nexus network. Its customers include Brooks Brothers, Sears, Adidas, Procter & Gamble, Del Monte Foods, Caterpillar Inc., Koch Industries, Abercrombie & Fitch, and Home Depot.

History 
 1998 – Founded in Alameda, CA as Tradiant.
 2001 - Renamed GT Nexus from Tradiant.
 2008 – Acquired Metaship, a provider of logistics management technology.
 2013 – Merged with TradeCard. Joint company employs about 1,000 people, and serves about 20,000 businesses in manufacturing, retail, and logistics.
 2014 - Acquired Clear Abacus, a cloud-based solution that optimizes multimodal transportation planning.
 2015 - Acquired by Infor, a technology company delivering industry-specific cloud suites. The deal, valued at $675 million, closed on September 21, 2015.
2018 - GT Nexus launched new global trade management platform.
2019 - GT Nexus relaunched as Infor Nexus.

Products 
Infor Nexus products are used by importers, exporters, logistics providers, and financial institutions to manage the flow of inventory, transactions, and information related to global trade. All capabilities are delivered in the cloud with a subscription pricing model.
 
The platform includes:
 Supply Chain Visibility
 Supply Chain Intelligence
 Factory Management 
 Transportation Management
 Inventory Management
 Supply Collaboration
 Procure-to-pay
 Supply Chain Finance

Competitors include SAP, Descartes, Oracle, and IBM.

See also
 Supply-chain management
 Supply chain management software
 Supply chain network
 Transportation management system
 Vendor relationship management

References

External links 
 Official Site

Supply chain software companies
Software companies based in California
Companies based in Oakland, California
Software companies established in 1998
ERP software companies
Service-oriented (business computing)
Cloud platforms
Business software companies
Defunct software companies of the United States